Inishkeel is a small tidal island and a townland off the coast of County Donegal, Ireland. The closest village on the mainland is Narin.

Geography
The island is located in Gweebarra Bay around 250 m from the coast. A sandy tidal bank connects, with low tide, the island with the mainland.

History

During the 6th century A.D. a small community of monks settled on the island. Their religious leader was Saint Conall Cael, from whom the island later derived its name. During the following centuries Inishkeel was a traditional destination of pilgrimages. Remains of the church and the connected buildings as well as some carved stones can be seen on the island. For its artistical and archeological importance the island was declared National Monument (code: DG064-003). A bell known as St Conall Cael's Bell remained on Inishkeel up to the 19th century and was then acquired by the British Museum.

Demography
A small community used to live on Inishkeel in the past, and in year 1841 23 inhabitants were registered on the island.
The island was later abandoned and in 2011 census had no inhabitants.

References

See also

 List of islands of Ireland
 List of National Monuments in County Donegal

Christian monasteries in the Republic of Ireland
Islands of County Donegal
National Monuments in County Donegal
Tidal islands of Ireland
Townlands of County Donegal
Uninhabited islands of Ireland